Engineer is an occupational surname and an occasional masculine given name that may refer to the following people:
Given name
Engineer Rashid (born 1967), Indian politician

Surname
 Aryana Engineer (born 2001), Canadian actress
 Asghar Ali Engineer (born 1939), Indian Islamic scholar and leader of the Progressive Dawoodi Bohra
 Aspy Engineer (1912–2002), Indian air marshal and ambassador to Iran
 Farokh Engineer (born 1938), Indian cricketer
Navin Engineer (born 1951), British billionaire

Occupational surnames
English-language surnames
English-language occupational surnames